Urbane Henry "Pick" Pickering (June 3, 1899 – May 13, 1970) was an American baseball player for the Boston Red Sox.

Biography

Pickering was born on June 3, 1899, in Hoxie, Kansas.

In 1931, Pickering made his Major League debut with the Boston Red Sox, on April 18. Throughout the season, he played 103 games for the team. He played most of his games at third base, although he played some at second base as well.

Pickering played the next year for the Red Sox. This year he played 132 games, being their everyday third baseman (and playing one game at catcher). He had a mediocre season, hitting .260 with 40 runs batted in, although gaining five triples.

Those were the only two seasons Pickering played in the Major Leagues. He served with the U.S. Army during World War II and later became chief of police of Modesto, California.

He died on May 13, 1970, in Modesto, at the age of 70.

References
Urbane Pickering at Baseball-Reference

1899 births
1970 deaths
Major League Baseball third basemen
Boston Red Sox players
Baseball players from Kansas
People from Hoxie, Kansas
Oakland Oaks (baseball) players
Decatur Commodores players
Birmingham Barons players
Montreal Royals players
Toronto Maple Leafs (International League) players